Charles Irving Martin (January 25, 1871 – May 8, 1953) was an American military officer and a lawyer.

Early life 
Charles Martin was born to William Martin and Mary Martin in Ogle County, Illinois in 1871.

Military career 
Martin enlisted as a private in the First Kansas Infantry regiment on 26 August 1890. While he was enlisted, Martin attended and graduated from the Normal School at Fort Scott in 1892. In 1893, Martin was commissioned as a second lieutenant in the same regiment, and promoted to captain the following year. He was transferred on 30 April 1898 to the 20th U.S. Volunteers, with  whom he saw action in the Philippines during the Spanish–American War. The following year, in 1899, Martin was promoted to major and was transferred to the 20th Kansas Volunteer Infantry, serving in the Philippines during the Philippine–American War.

He returned to the United States in 1901, still part of the 20th Kansas, but working as the clerk for Bourbon County, Kansas district court, position which he held until 1905. During his time as the Bourbon County clerk, Martin was admitted to the Kansas bar and practiced in Fort Scott, Topeka and Wichita. From 1905 to 1909, Martin served as inspector general of the Kansas National Guard as a brigadier general.

First World War 
From 1909 to 1917, Martin served as the Adjutant General of the Kansas and commanded the 1st Infantry Brigade of the Kansas National Guard as a Brigadier General. On 5 August 1917, some time after the United States' entry into World War I, Martin was given command of the 70th Infantry Brigade, 35th Infantry Division, and departed for France with the rest of the division in May 1918, arriving in Liverpool on 8 May 1918. In May 1918, Martin served as an observer with the British army while the 35th Division was assigned to their reserve lines during the Spring Offensive of 1918. From July to September 1918, Martin and the 70th Brigade manned a quiet portion of the trenches, before participating in the Saint-Mihiel offensive, although not directly as the 35th Division did not see action until 26 September 1918.

Martin was relieved of command prior to the 70th Infantry Brigade's first action, as he was replaced on 21 September 1918 by Colonel Kirby Walker, 139th Infantry Regiment. He was honorably discharged on 1 December 1918.

Inter-War period 
Martin was recommissioned in 1921 as the commanding officer of the 69th Infantry Brigade, Kansas National Guard. During this time, Martin continued to practice law and was admitted to the U.S. Supreme Court bar in 1923. In 1932, now a major general, Martin was given command of the 35th (National Guard) Division until his retirement in 1935.

Personal life & death 
Charles Irving Martin married Lou Ida Ward on 28 November 1894. Together, they had one child, Lillia Mae Markley.

Prior to his retirement, Martin worked as the manager of the Veterans Administration facility in Wadsworth, Leavenworth County, Kansas, from 1927. He retired from this job in 1941.

Martin lived out the rest of his retirement in Cheyenne, Wyoming, where he died on 8 May 1953. He is buried at the Leavenworth National Cemetery.

References

Bibliography 
Davis, Henry Blaine. Generals in Khaki, (Raleigh, NC: Pentland Press, 1998), pp. 245–255 
Ferguson, Daren. 35th Infantry: Trails of the Santa Fe Division, (Paducah, KY: Turner Publishing, 1994) 
"Gen Charles Irving Martin", Charles Irving Martin, Find a Grave, Accessed 25 June 2019. Gen Charles Irving Martin (1871-1953) - Find A Grave Memorial
Kenamore, Clair. From Vauquois Hill to Exermont: A History of the 35th Division, (Saint Louis, MO: Guard Publishing Co.) 
Schrantz, Ward. A Machine-Gunner in France: The Memoirs of Ward Schrantz, 35th Division, 1917-1919 (Denton, TX: University of North Texas Press, 2019), pp. 245
Who Was Who in American History - The Military (Chicago, IL: Marquis Who's Who, Inc., 1975) pp. 356

1871 births
1953 deaths
American military personnel of the Spanish–American War
American military personnel of the Philippine–American War
Military personnel from Illinois
United States Army generals
National Guard (United States) generals
United States Army generals of World War I
People from Ogle County, Illinois